Wikipedia in China may refer to:

Chinese Wikipedia, the Chinese-language version of Wikipedia
Blocking of Wikipedia in mainland China, the People's Republic of China's policy of preventing access to Wikipedia from within the country